Trixie Belden is a series of 'girl detective' mysteries written between 1948 and 1986. The first six books were written by Julie Campbell Tatham. The following 33 titles were written by various in-house writers of Western Publishing under the pseudonym Kathryn Kenny. Between 2003 and 2006, Random House republished the first fifteen books of the series with new cover art illustrated by pulp artist Michael Koelsch. There has been no news of Random House publishing the remaining 24 books.

Original six written by Julie Campbell Tatham

1. The Secret of the Mansion (1948)

The book opens with thirteen-year-old Trixie begging her mother for a horse. Her two older brothers are away at camp for the summer, and Trixie is afraid she will be bored at their house, Crabapple Farm. The family cannot afford a horse, so Trixie is told she will have to save her money to buy one. She then sees a horse trailer outside a neighboring mansion. The Wheelers, a rich family from New York City, have just bought the mansion and are moving in with their teenaged daughter, Honey. Although tough Trixie thinks Honey is a sissy at first, they soon become fast friends. Trixie realizes that Honey really is a "poor little rich girl", her parents are never home, she has been very sickly, and she grew up at boarding schools, at camps, and with governesses. Trixie helps her new friend overcome these problems, while Honey balances Trixie's rash and impatient personality with her tactfulness and gentleness.

Recently, Trixie's neighbor on the other side was taken to the hospital with pneumonia. Trixie uses this chance to explore around the miser's rundown old mansion. Under the pretense of locking a window, Trixie and Honey climb inside to look around.  They are shocked to find a tall, redheaded boy asleep on a mattress.  The boy is Jim Frayne, the miser's 15-year-old great-nephew, who is running away from his abusive stepfather. The three become close friends, with the girls smuggling food to the mansion for Jim. Local legend says the old man hid his fortune in the house, electing to live in poverty after his beloved wife’s death. Honey and Jim are doubtful, but Trixie is sure the money is there somewhere if only they can find it before Jim's evil stepfather comes looking for him.

Eventually, Jonesy, the stepfather, does come after a newspaper article about an airplane crashing near the miser's mansion also features the news of the miser's death, the legend of the fortune, and a photo of a fireplace with Jim's silver christening mug on the mantle. Trixie finds the engagement ring that Jim's great-uncle gave his wife in a safe.

After Jonesy shows up, Trixie wakes up in the middle of the night and sees smoke from her window. The girls call the fire department and go to warn Jim. The mansion is burned almost to the ground, and Jim sleeps in the hidden summerhouse.  When Trixie and Honey go there to the next morning to visit him, they find him gone and a note with the engagement ring in the summerhouse saying goodbye. He has run away again, this time in possession of some money he found hidden in the mattress he had been sleeping on.

The girls meet the great-uncle's lawyer, Mr. Rainsford, who tells them Jim's uncle set up a half-million dollar trust for him and that Jonesy will be replaced as the boy's guardian. He asks them to track Jim down.

2. The Red Trailer Mystery (1950)

Jim Frayne ran away at the end of The Secret of the Mansion, but later his great-uncle's lawyer showed up, revealing that Jim inherited half a million dollars and is going to be removed from his abusive stepfather's custody. So Trixie and Honey set off in the Wheelers' trailer with Honey's governess Miss Trask to find their missing friend. They decide to check the boys' camps upstate since Jim mentioned getting a job there, but he always seems to be one step ahead of them.

On the trip, Trixie and Honey are faced with: a strange and poor family in a luxurious trailer; that family's missing daughter; Mrs. Smith, a fat and motherly woman who's missing her locket; a trailer-robbing ring; and two suspicious workers at their trailer camp who may be involved. Trixie knows that the mysteries are tied together and the answer lies in the nearby forest.

At the end of the book, Honey's parents return. Honey runs to her mother and gives her a hug, something she has never done before.  Her mother forgets her own shyness and hugs her daughter back. Jim is adopted by the Wheeler family, giving Honey an older brother.  Jim tells Trixie that he is in charge now, but Trixie tells him to wait for her older brothers, Mart and Brian, to get back from camp.

3.  The Gatehouse Mystery (1951).

The Gatehouse Mystery marks a point in the series when the hallmarks of the Trixie Belden books are solidly established. This book introduces Trixie's older brothers and marks the establishment of the "Bob-Whites of the Glen" club. The plot involves an adventure that follows when Trixie and Honey explore an old, abandoned gatehouse on the Wheelers' property which is to become their clubhouse.

4. The Mysterious Visitor (1954)

This book marks the entry of Diana (Di) Lynch and a man staying with her family who may or may not be her long-lost uncle.  The end of this book foreshadows events that occur in The Mystery in Arizona.

5. The Mystery Off Glen Road (1956)

When the clubhouse is badly damaged, Brian uses the money he has been saving to buy a jalopy in order to purchase repair materials. To help him keep the car, Trixie wants to use the ring Jim gave her in the first volume as collateral. She also plans to get the Bob-Whites hired as temporary gamekeepers for Mr. Wheeler so that they can raise enough money to pay for the car. However, while they were patrolling, they come across the path of a mysterious poacher.

6. The Mystery in Arizona (1958)

Trixie, while at Di's "real" uncle's ranch, tries to find out what happened to Uncle Monty's employees when they mysteriously disappear.

Books written under the pseudonym Kathryn Kenny 

7. The Mysterious Code (1961)

After the school district cracks down on secret clubs, Trixie and the other Bob-Whites put on an antique show to prove their worth. While collecting antiques, Trixie is robbed by thieves and finds a mysterious code in Honey's house. In the midst of this, romance blooms between Jim Frayne and Trixie Belden, making readers wonder what happens next!

8. The Black Jacket Mystery (1961)

A new kid, Dan Mangan, appears in town right when bad things start to happen in Sleepyside, which makes Trixie suspicious as she tries to find out his past.

9. The Happy Valley Mystery (1962)

Trixie and the club (except for Dan) go to Trixie's Uncle Andrew's farm, Happy Valley, in Iowa. Trixie tries to find sheep thieves after Uncle Andrew's sheep go missing.

Trixie and Jim's relationship develops  in this book. Trixie is jealous of Jim's "girlfriend", Dot, and Jim is jealous of Trixie's "boyfriend", the basketball team captain, Ned Schulz. These two and Barbara's twin brother, Bob, reappear in the twelfth volume.

10. The Marshland Mystery (1962)

The Wheelers' guest, a young musical prodigy, goes missing, and Trixie and Honey try to find her while discovering what's going on near Martin's Marsh.

11. The Mystery at Bob-White Cave (1963)

Trixie and the gang (minus Dan and Di) go to Uncle Andrew's cabin in the Ozarks (Missouri) and try to find out what is haunting the cabin nearby. They also hunt for fish for a contest, which could win the Bob-Whites $500 for a charity.

12. The Mystery of the Blinking Eye (1963)

Trixie, while waiting for Ned, Barbara and Bob (from the ninth volume) in New York, receives a strange fortune from a woman and later, while shopping, buys an ugly Inca doll and is chased by unknown enemies.

13. The Mystery on Cobbett's Island (1964)

Trixie tries to find a missing inheritance during a vacation on Cobbett's Island.

14. The Mystery of the Emeralds (1965)

Trixie, after finding a hidden letter in her house, traces a fortune to Virginia.

15. The Mystery on the Mississippi (1965)

When Trixie finds some mysterious drawings, the others think it was just some drawings drawn by a kid. They start thinking differently after someone tries to kill Trixie over the drawings

16. The Mystery of the Missing Heiress (1970)

17. The Mystery of the Uninvited Guest (1977)

18. The Mystery of the Phantom Grasshopper (1977)

Trixie and her friends investigate the disappearance of a beloved weather vane in Sleepyside.

19. The Secret of the Unseen Treasure (1977)

20. The Mystery off Old Telegraph Road (1978)

After school, Trixie and Honey look around the art fair and are disappointed with the lack of displays. Nick Roberts, head of the art club, says that the club does not have the money to have more displays. Eager to help, the Bob-Whites get into the idea of a bike-a-ton. Trixie asks for Nick's help in making the posters for the bike-a-ton; however, Nick disagrees and tries to convince Trixie not to have the event. With or without Nick's help, Trixie decides to go ahead with her plans. However, trouble soon starts. Honey gets into a fight with Trixie over Ben Riker, and Trixie is blamed for all the wrongdoings in the club. Trixie sees Nick Roberts ripping down her precious poster, and the bike-a-ton may be canceled.

21. The Mystery of the Castaway Children (1978)

The Beldens find a baby inside Reddy's doghouse.

22. The Mystery on Mead's Mountain (1978)

23. The Mystery of the Queen's Necklace (1979)

24. The Mystery at Saratoga (1979)

After Regan disappears, Trixie and Honey follow his trail to Saratoga and attempt to clear him of committing an old crime.

25. The Sasquatch Mystery (1979)

Miss Trask and the Bob-Whites (except Dan) go camping with the Belden cousins (Knut, Cap and Hallie) in Idaho, where they see what appears to be a sasquatch. The mystery deepens when the creature seems to commit a violent act.

26. The Mystery of the Headless Horseman (1979)

27. The Mystery of the Ghostly Galleon (1979)

While visiting at an inn owned by Miss Trask's brother, Trixie and the others attempt to solve an old mystery about a ship's captain who vanished in an unknown manner. They also help Mr. Trask, who is supposed to pay off a major loan that weekend.

28. The Hudson River Mystery (1979)

29. The Mystery of the Velvet Gown (1980)

30. The Mystery of the Midnight Marauder (1980)

Mart is suspected of committing several crimes around town.

31. The Mystery at Maypenny's (1980)

A furniture company wants to purchase some of Mr. Maypenny's land and some of Mr. Wheeler's land on the game preserve in order to expand. Mr. Wheeler is willing to sell, but Mr. Maypenny refuses. Sleepyside residents are equally torn about the issue. Also, Mr. Maypenny's nephew arrives for a visit.

32. The Mystery of the Whispering Witch (1980)

Trixie and Honey help a classmate who lives in a house that is rumored to be haunted.

33. The Mystery of the Vanishing Victim (1980)

34. The Mystery of the Missing Millionaire (1980)

35. The Mystery of the Memorial Day Fire (1984)

Trixie tries to find an arsonist and exonerate a father of her classmate's.

36. The Mystery of the Antique Doll (1984)

37. The Pet Show Mystery (1985)

38. The Indian Burial Ground Mystery (1985)

39. The Mystery of the Galloping Ghost (1986)

References

External links
Trixie Belden Official site
Trixie Belden Information
 Publisher's website for The Gatehouse Mystery.
 Book summary at trixie-belden.com.
 The Gatehouse Mystery at Google Books.

Book series introduced in 1948
Novel series
Juvenile series
Lists of novels
Western Publishing
American mystery novels by series